Lotika Zellermeier (Lotika Cilermajer) (1860 in Kraków, Poland – 1938 in Višegrad, Yugoslavia) was the inspiration for the main character from the 1961 Nobel Prize winner Ivo Andrić’s novel The Bridge on the Drina. She is the oldest of three sisters Zellermeier who moved, at the end of the 19th century, to Bosnia from Kraków, Poland.

Biography
Little is known about Lotika's childhood and early adulthood. She was married to a doctor in Kraków but his identity is not known today. He died when Lotika was 19 years old. Soon after her husband's death, Lotika moved with her sisters to Višegrad, Bosnia and Herzegovina, then Austria-Hungary. At the same time two other Jewish families, Zaller and Apfelmeier, moved from Kraków to Višegrad. Their destinies will inseparably entwine in the coming years.

Even she was widowed at such an early age, Lotika never married again and had no descendants.

A bit more is known about Lotika's life after she moved to Bosnia. In Višegrad she worked as a manager of the Zur Brucke hotel, commonly known as Lotika’s Hotel among the locals. The owner of the hotel was husband of her sister Debora, Adolf Zaller.
While she was managing the hotel, one of the regulars was Ivo Andrić. The two of them built a close relationship over the years.

Lotika and Ivo Andrić

Ivo Andrić has spent his childhood, youth and early adulthood in Višegrad  and he enjoyed spending time in Lotika’s Hotel. Having established a close relationship with Lotika, he used her and her family as a basis for many of the characters in his novel The Bridge on the Drina. When he won Nobel Prize for literature in 1961, 23 years after Lotika's death, her nieces Ina and Helena congratulated him in a letter. He kindly responded thanking them.

Family
Lotika's sister Debora was married to Adolph Zaller, also mentioned in Andrić's novel. Their daughter Ina married Drago Maras, a doctor from Zagreb. They lived in Montreal, Quebec, Canada, for the rest of their lives.

The youngest sister, Adelaide, married Lavoslav Sperling, a businessman from Višegrad. They had five children, sons Samuel, a banker killed by Nazis in Vienna in 1941, Benjamin, a leather factory owner in Leipzig, also killed at the beginning of the Second World War, Ferdinand who was killed at the Sajmište concentration camp in Belgrade, Yugoslavia, and daughters Ana, who died of tuberculosis at an early age, and Serafina, the only child to survive the war.

Lotika today
Film director Emir Kusturica owns a traditional coffee shop Lotika on the grounds of the Mokra Gora National Park in Serbia. His business enterprise also bears Lotika's name (Lotika d.o.o). Belgrade TV station B92 has kept those facts in the focus of the Serbian public.

As a beneficiary of the funds granted by the Serbian Ministry of Culture, Kusturica is working on the opera The Bridge on the Drina.

References

External links
The Ivo Andrić Foundation
Višegrad on TripAdvisor.com

1860 births
1938 deaths
19th-century Polish Jews
Characters in novels of the 20th century
Polish emigrants to Yugoslavia